Alexei Panshin (August 14, 1940 – August 21, 2022) was an American writer and science fiction critic. He wrote several critical works and several novels, including the 1968 Nebula Award–winning novel Rite of Passage and, with his wife Cory Panshin, the 1990 Hugo Award–winning study of science fiction The World Beyond the Hill.

Personal life 
Panshin was born in Lansing, Michigan, on August 14, 1940. He died on August 21, 2022, at the age of 82.

Career

Fiction 
Panshin was the author of the Anthony Villiers series made up of Star Well, The Thurb Revolution, and Masque World. A fourth volume entitled The Universal Pantograph, never appeared, reputedly because of conflicts between the writer and his publisher. Of the Villiers series, noted SF writer Samuel R. Delany writes in the foreword of Star Well:

New Celebrations, an omnibus volume collecting the first three volumes, has appeared.

Panshin wrote a novel, Earth Magic with his wife, Cory Panshin. His works also include a short story collection, Farewell To Yesterday's Tomorrow.

Nonfiction 
Panshin published a study of the prominent American science fiction author Robert A. Heinlein, Heinlein in Dimension.

Most of this work was originally published in fanzines, for which Panshin won the Best Fan Writer Hugo award in 1967. The writings were then published in book form by Advent. Panshin discusses reactions to this work on his website The Abyss of Wonder.

Panshin's general critical work SF in Dimension (1976) was also co-written with Cory Panshin, as was his lengthy theoretical-critical The World Beyond The Hill: Science Fiction and the Quest for Transcendence (1989), which received a Hugo Award for Best Related Work. A number of Alexei Panshin's books (including The World Beyond the Hill) are being republished by Phoenix Pick, an imprint of Arc Manor Publishers.

Published work

Fiction

Novels

Short fiction collections

Nonfiction

References

Citations

Bibliography

External links 
 
 Complete text of Heinlein In Dimension
 
 Bibliography at Fantastic fiction
 Review of Rite of Passage and comments on Panshin's writings generally
 Review of Rite of Passage
 Review of the Villiers books, by Jed Hartman
 

1940 births
2022 deaths
Writers from Lansing, Michigan
20th-century American novelists
American male novelists
American science fiction writers
American speculative fiction critics
Hugo Award-winning writers
Hugo Award-winning fan writers
Nebula Award winners
Science fiction critics
American male short story writers
20th-century American short story writers
20th-century American male writers
American male non-fiction writers